Solms is a surname. Notable people with the surname include:

Feodora Schenk (née Solms, 1920–2006), Austrian athlete
Hermann Otto Solms (born 1940), German politician
Mark Solms (born 1961), South African psychoanalyst and neuropsychologist